Carly Stone is a Canadian film director and screenwriter.

Personal life
Stone was born and raised in Toronto, by parents who were immigrants from South Africa.

She and her lawyer husband make their home in Toronto.

Career
Prior to directing her first feature film, The New Romantic she worked as a writer for the television series Kim's Convenience. The New Romantic premiered in March 2018, at the South by Southwest Festival.

Her second feature film, North of Normal, is slated to premiere at the 2022 Toronto International Film Festival.

References

Canadian people of South African descent
Canadian television writers
Film directors from Toronto
Living people
Writers from Toronto
Year of birth missing (living people)
Canadian women television writers